is a 1993 action game developed by HAL Laboratory and published by Square for the Super Famicom. It is one of the titles Square did not develop but did publish. Controlling the swordsman Alen, who embarks on a journey to stop the demon tribe led by Babilom, an emperor planning to conquer the world with his imperial army and the titular demon god who revived from his previous defeat a thousand years ago, the player explore and search for items to progress and power-ups, fighting bosses and minibosses. During gameplay, Alen meets Guardians that aid him with their power, and allies that join him along the way.

First announced in 1992 under the tentative name Guardian Blade, Alcahest was created by HAL Laboratory, known for their work on the Kirby franchise. It was directed and designed by Atsushi Kakuta, with late Nintendo president Satoru Iwata serving as producer. The music was composed by Jun Ishikawa, known for his work on the Kirby series. The game was supplemented by a strategy guidebook. Though it was not officially published outside Japan, an English fan translation was released in 2002. It never received an official soundtrack release unlike other Square titles, although its main theme was included as part of a compilation album published in 2017.

Alcahest was well received by critics who reviewed it as an import title; praise was given to aspects such as its graphics engine for eschewing the super deformed style prevalent on Super Famicom, intuitive controls, blend of action and role-playing elements, the variety of partners, diverse and flowing level design, simple but dynamic arcade-style gameplay, accessibility due to the light use of Japanese and challenge. Reviewers also noted that the game's style and combat system were reminiscent of Zelda and Soul Blazer, but most felt mixed regarding the music, while criticism was geared towards its puzzles, lack of proper character interaction, short length, scenario and repetitive dungeons.

Gameplay 

Alcahest is an arcade-style action game with RPG elements, that plays from a top-down perspective similar to titles like The Legend of Zelda and Soul Blazer, in which the player assume the role of swordsman Alen embarking on a journey to stop the demon tribe led by Babilom, an emperor planning to conquer world with his imperial army and the titular demon god who revived from his previous defeat a thousand years ago. Prior to starting, an options menu can be accessed at the game's title screen, where any of the four available difficulty settings can be selected or change the controls setup. The player traverses through eight stages, populated with an assortment of enemies and obstacles, that are progressed by finding items and power-ups that aid Alen on his quest. Every stage has bosses and minibosses, which  must be fought in order to progress further.

Alen is capable of attacking enemies using a blade bestowed on him by the Guardians; After specific boss fights, the player gains the abilities of one of the four Guardians (based on the four classical elements). Alen can also charge his blade for a special attack, which differ depending on the elemental Guardian selected. MP is used to summon Guardians in battle. The player can swap between each Guardian by pressing the shoulder buttons. Alen can also perform dash attacks when running by double-tapping the d-pad, as well as block projectile attack by standing still with his shield. Along the way, Alen meets five allies that join him at predetermined points of some stages. They are the young wizard Garstein, the princess Elikshil, the knight Sirius, the android Magna and the shape-shifting dragon goddess Nevis. Though they cannot be controlled directly, allies attack and use special moves when the corresponding button is pressed. "Special Points" (SP) is required for a partner's special attack.

Alcahest employs a checkpoint system where the player will start off at the beginning of the checkpoint Alen managed to reach before dying. Alen's vitality decreases when attacked, but is increased at the end of each stage. Certain items found on each stage restore Alen's status. Once Alen's vitality is depleted, the game is over. Alen gains experience points (EXP) by defeating enemies and bosses. After gaining a certain number of experience points, the player earns an additional continue to keep playing. The player is given passwords at the beginning of each new stage.

Development and release 
Alcahest was developed by HAL Laboratory, a Japanese game developer known for their work on the Kirby franchise. It was directed and designed by Atsushi Kakuta. Late Nintendo president Satoru Iwata, known for his work on titles such as Balloon Fight and EarthBound, served as executive producer. Hiroaki Suga acted as chief programmer, with Ryuki Kuraoka, Miya Aoki, Shigenobu Kasai and Teruyuki Gunji acting as co-programmers. Hitoshi Kikkawa, Shigeru Hashiguchi, Tsuyoshi Wakayama, Satoshi Ishida and Tetsuya Notoya were responsible for the pixel art as co-graphic designers. Wakayama was also responsible for map design. Character visuals were done by an artist credited as R. Ishida. The music was composed by Jun Ishikawa, known for his work on the Kirby series. Ishikawa's soundtrack emphasises action and a light adventurous feel.

Alcahest was first announced in 1992 under the tentative name Guardian Blade. The game was published by Squaresoft, famous for the Final Fantasy franchise, for the Super Famicom on December 17, 1993 and was housed in a 8-megabit (1 MB) cartridge. It is one of the games Square did not develop but did publish. The release was supplemented by a strategy guidebook published by NTT Publishing. Although it was not officially published outside Japan, an English fan translation was released in 2002, which was later revised and corrected in 2014. Unlike other Square titles, it never received an official soundtrack release, although its main theme was included as part of a 2017 compilation album published by Hyperdub.

Reception 

Alcahest was well received by critics who reviewed it as an import title. Public reception was also positive, receiving a 21.2 out of 30 score in a poll taken by Family Computer Magazine, indicating a popular following. Famitsus four reviewers gave it a 27 out of 40 rating. Electronic Gaming Monthlys Terri Aki regarded it as a "great counterpart" to role-playing games by Square like Final Fantasy II and Secret of Mana due to its top-view perspective, setting and plot, noting that the game's style was similar to Zelda and Soul Blazer. Joypads Jean-François Morisse praised its audiovisual presentation, animations, controls, balance between action and adventure, as well as the variety of partners, stating that the combat system was reminiscent of Soul Blader. However, Morisse noted that the Japanese text might be inconvenient but does not prevent from going through all the levels. Super Plays Tony Mott commended its visuals, sound, action-heavy gameplay and flowing level design, but criticized aspects such as the puzzles and lack of proper character interaction. Computer and Video Games gave positive remarks to the varied graphics, "gorgeous" sprites, sound effects and simple playability, but criticized the music for not carrying atmosphere and repetitiveness resulting from the game's simplicity. 

Super Consoles Piefranco Merenda and Massimiliano Diaco shared the same opinion as CVG, commending the visual presentation, sound effects, playability and challenge due to the multiple difficulty levels, but also criticized the music score and repetitiveness. Both Merenda and Diaco described it as a game not devoid of originality but of real emotions. Retro Gamers Hagen Dragmire and Darran Jones noted its blend of action and role-playing elements, partner mechanic, audiovisual presentation and accessibility due to the light use of Japanese. Jeuxvideo.coms Zashy gave positive remarks to the visuals, diverse level design, intuitive and dynamic gameplay, as well as the guardian and allies for adding diversification into enemy encounters, but felt mixed regarding the music and criticized its short length, scenario and repetitive dungeons. Nintendo Lifes Gonçalo Lopes praised its intuitive controls, arcade-style gameplay, Jun Ishikawa's soundtrack and graphics engine for eschewing the super deformed style prevalent on Super Famicom.

Notes

References

External links 

 Alcahest at GameFAQs
 Alcahest at Giant Bomb
 Alcahest at MobyGames

1993 video games
Action video games
Fantasy video games
HAL Laboratory games
Japan-exclusive video games
Square (video game company) games
Super Nintendo Entertainment System games
Super Nintendo Entertainment System-only games
Top-down video games
Video games developed in Japan